Harrison Township is one of twelve townships in Pulaski County, Indiana, United States. As of the 2010 census, its population was 628 and it contained 288 housing units.

History
Harrison Township was organized in 1841, and named for William Henry Harrison (1773–1841), the ninth President of the United States (1841).

Geography

Adjacent townships
 Tippecanoe Township (north)
 Aubbeenaubbee Township, Fulton County (northeast)
 Union Township, Fulton County (east)
 Wayne Township, Fulton County (southeast)
 Van Buren Township (south)
 Indian Creek Township (southwest)
 Monroe Township (west)

Major highways
  U.S. Route 35
  Indiana State Road 14

Lakes
 Bruce Lake

Education
 Eastern Pulaski Community School Corporation

Harrison Township residents may obtain a free library card from the Pulaski County Public Library in Winamac.

Political districts
 Indiana's 2nd congressional district
 State House District 20
 State Senate District 18

References
 United States Census Bureau 2008 TIGER/Line Shapefiles
 United States Board on Geographic Names (GNIS)
 IndianaMap

External links
 Indiana Township Association
 United Township Association of Indiana

Townships in Pulaski County, Indiana
Townships in Indiana